History of a Salaryman (lit. "Salaryman Cho Han Ji") is a 2012 South Korean television series that aired on SBS from January 2 to March 31, 2012 on Mondays and Tuesdays at 21:55 for 22 episodes. Starring Lee Beom-soo, Jung Ryeo-won, Jung Gyu-woon, Hong Soo-hyun, Lee Deok-hwa, and Kim Seo-hyung, the series is a quirky comedy and murder mystery about an ordinary salaryman who finds himself involved with corporate spies and rival pharmaceutical companies. It satirizes the historical events during China's Chu–Han Contention (206–202 B.C.) using the background of modern office politics.

Plot
Yoo-bang (Lee Beom-soo) sneaks into a villa at night and discovers the dead body of Chunha Medical Group executive Ho-hae (Park Sang-myun). His niece Yeo-chi (Jung Ryeo-won) is hiding in the room. At the funeral, both Yoo-bang and Yeo-chi get arrested for murder. How did things come to this? It all began three months ago when Chunha began trial testing for their new medicine. In exchange for a job recommendation from Ho-hae, Yoo-bang agrees to join the trial testing and steal information about the drug. Rival company director Hang-woo (Jung Gyu-woon) is also there undercover to find out about the new drug. Spoiled rich girl Yeo-chi is undergoing training because her grandfather wants her to inherit Chunha one day, though she herself is completely uninterested. For the trial testing, 30 testers, including Yoo-bang and Hang-woo, are shut off from the outside world for 10 days. During the trial period, strange things begin to happen...

Cast
Lee Beom-soo as Yoo-bang
Hero of the series who is a bright and optimistic man. He steals the heart of Yeo-chi. His historical analogue is Liu Bang, the first emperor of Han Dynasty.
Jung Ryeo-won as Baek Yeo-chi
A spoiled rich girl who was raised by her grandfather after her parents' death. Her historical analogue is Empress Lü Zhi.
Jung Gyu-woon as Choi Hang-woo
A man who tries to get revenge against Chairman Jin for his father's suicide. His fiancée is Cha Woo Hee. His historical analogue is Xiang Yu, the self-styled "Hegemon King" of Western Chu.
Hong Soo-hyun as Cha Woo-hee
A woman who is engaged to Hang-woo, and whom Yoo-bang is very close with. In an earlier draft of the script, Woo-hee dies after reuniting with Hang-woo, but the script was modified to give fans a happier ending. Her historical analogue is Consort Yu.
Kim Seo-hyung as Mo Ga-bi
Antagonist of the series. She worked as the secretary for Jin Si-hwang, whom she later kills to become the company chairman herself. She manipulates people to do her bidding, among them her colleague Park Bum-jung, who sincerely loved her. In the end she goes insane after she is found guilty for conspiring to kill Jin and the attempted murder of Woo-hee. Her historical analogue is Zhao Gao, an official who served all 3 emperors of the Qin Dynasty yet played an instrumental role in the dynasty's downfall.
Lee Deok-hwa as Jin Si-hwang (Yeo-chi's grandfather). His historical analogue is Qin Shi Huang, the last emperor of Qin Dynasty.
Kim Il-woo as Jang Ryang. His historical analogue is Zhang Liang.
Yoon Yong-hyun as Bun Kwae. His historical analogue is Fan Kuai.
Lee Ki-young as Park Bum-jung. His historical analogue is Fan Zeng.
Yoo Hyung-kwan  as So Ha. His historical analogue is Xiao He.
Yang Hyung-wook  as Han Shin. His historical analogue is Han Xin.
Kim Eung-soo as Oh Ji-rak
Park Sang-myun as Jin Ho-hae. His historical analogue is Hu Hai.
Jang Hyun-sung as Choi Hang-ryang. His historical analogue is Xiang Liang.
Im Hyun-sik – Yoo-bang's father (Liu Bang's father Liu Taigong)
Lee Joo-shil – Yoo-bang's mother (Liu Bang's mother Wang Hanshi)
Kim Ji-young – Ji-won
Lee Joon – Yeo-chi's boyfriend (cameo, ep 1)
Jeong Bo-seok – Congressman Jo Pil-yeon (cameo, ep 6), the antagonist in the series Giant.
Jeon Jae-hyung – Delivery man (cameo)
Kang Kyung-joon – Bok Sa-yeol (cameo, ep 17)
 Kim Sung-oh – Prosecutor Park Moon-soo (cameo, ep 20)

Soundtrack
 성냥팔이 소녀 (Little Match Girl) – Yoon Gun feat. Misty
 너 때문에 (For You) – JeA (Brown Eyed Girls)
 Bravo – Lee Teuk (Super Junior), Key (SHINee)
 기대했단 말야 (Not What I Expected) – JOO
 샐러리맨 초한지 Title 
 막무가내 
 Relax Your Mind 
 긴 여정 
 Determination
 자중지란 
 군웅할거 
 방이 Theme 
 천년지애 
 낙장불입 
 샐러리맨 초한지 Score Title 
 도원결의 
 비육지탄

Episode ratings

Sources: TNmS Media Korea, AGB Nielsen Korea

Awards and nominations

References

External links
  
 

2012 South Korean television series debuts
2012 South Korean television series endings
Seoul Broadcasting System television dramas
Television shows written by Jang Young-chul
South Korean thriller television series
Television series by JS Pictures